Le Krewe d'Etat is a satirical New Orleans Carnival Krewe.

History and formation 

Krewe d'Etat's first inaugural parade was in 1998.  Prior to organizing their own parade, a member of the krewe known simply as Unknown Spokesman said the group had covertly infiltrated Pegasus with some floats of their own. The krewe has historically paraded on the Friday prior to Fat Tuesday, immediately following Hermes.  The parade route originally started at Magazine and Napoleon but now follows the traditional route that starts at Jefferson and Magazine, heading downtown to Magazine and Napoleon, then towards the lake on Napoleon to St. Charles, then heading downtown towards Lee Circle, around Lee Circle, and finally onto Canal Street.  The procession includes traditional floats, Lieutenants on horseback, and flambeaux carriers.  In 2013, d'Etat had 23 floats and roughly 450 riders.

d'Etat's motto is "Vivite ut Vehatis. Vehite ut Vevatis," which roughly translates to "Live to Ride, Ride to Live."

Membership 
Membership is open, but the Krewe has elected to keep the organization small.

Parade
Krewe d'Etat parades on Vendredi Gras after Krewe of Hermes on the Uptown route. The Skeleton Walking Krewe hands out the D'Etat Gazette (Carnival Bulletin) leading the parade which provides an overview of the floats.

Le Krewe d'Etat utilize flambeaux to light the parade route.

Krewe d'Etat is notable for being the first Mardi Gras parade to throw blinking beads.

Parade themes 
The Krewe decides a new theme for their parade annually ("raison d'etre"), and it, just like The Dictator's identity, remains confidential.  The parade floats are intended to lampoon current events, politicians, socialites, business moguls, etc.

Dictology 
Le Krewe d'Etat eschews monarchy in favor of a figurehead known simply as "The Dictator" whose identity is held secret. The Dictator's "court" includes the Kingfish, the Special Man, the Minister of Misinformation, the Keeper of the Bones and the High Priest.

References

External links 
Le Krewe D'Etat's Website
The Times-Picayune's photo gallery of Le Krewe D'Etat
Flickr user Chuck T.'s photo set of Le Krewe d'Etat
Photos of Le Krewe d'Etat's line up at the intersection of Napoleon and Tchoupitoulas Avenues
Photos from 2007's d'Etat parade

Mardi Gras in New Orleans